West Richland is a city in Benton County, Washington. The population was 16,295 at the time of the 2020 census. The city is part of the Tri-Cities metropolitan area, whose principal cities (the Tri-Cities) are Richland, Kennewick, and Pasco.

History

The original people of the region were the Chemnapum Indians (closely related to the Wanapum tribe), living near the mouth of the Yakima River. Lewis and Clark passed through the area in 1805, and an expedition of the Army Corps of Topographical Engineers headed by Robert E Johnson mapped the Yakima Valley in 1841. 

In 1853, a road was authorized by Congress to pass through the Yakima Valley, and passed through present-day West Richland; however, settlement did not properly begin until the late 1870s. The first schoolhouse was built in 1896 on the Van Horn Property just south of what is now Van Giesen Street. Benton County was created in 1905, Richland was incorporated in 1906, and the West Richland area was known as 'Lower Yakima'. 

An irrigation canal from the north side of Horn Rapids Dam was built in 1908 to bring water into Richland. 

The Yellowstone Trail, a national highway stretching from Albany, New York, to Seattle, was located through the Yakima Valley in 1917 and 1918. It crossed the Fallon Bridge between Richland and West Richland and then proceeded directly west to Kiona. 

During the 1940s, the city of Richland was built, run and maintained by the War Department for the duration of the Manhattan Project. A number of residents had chafed at the government's regulations, and as a result many of them had moved across the Yakima River, where it was possible to purchase land and own (rather than rent) a house. 

It was proposed that it be named Heminger City (presumably after himself), but in 1949 the townspeople chose the name Enterprise instead. Heminger moved a mile down the road in protest, and platted a small community there called Heminger City. This was eventually incorporated in the West Richland City limits. When the time came in 1955 to incorporate the town, it was decided to rename to West Richland, taking advantage of the already well-known status of nearby Richland. West Richland was officially incorporated on June 17, 1955, combining the two towns of Heminger City and Enterprise. 

Geography
West Richland is located at  (46.292085, -119.354417).

Climate
According to the Köppen Climate Classification system, West Richland has a semi-arid climate, abbreviated "BSk" on climate maps, falling slightly short of being classified as a desert climate.

Demographics

2020 census
As of the 2020 census, there were 16,295 people and 4,640 households in the city. The population density was 731.4 per square mile (282.4/km2). The racial makeup of the city was 86.9% White, 1.3% African American, 0.1% Native American, 1.2% Asian, 0.3% Pacific Islander, 3.5% from other races, and 6.7% from two or more races. Hispanic or Latino of any race were 13.4% of the population. Non-Hispanic Whites comprised 80.3% of the population.

There were 4,640 households with an average number of 3.2 persons per household. The median income for a household in the city was $102,974. The per capita income for the city was $36,735. About 7% of persons were below the poverty line. There were 933 Veterans in the city and 6.2% of the population was foreign born.

2010 census
As of the 2010 census, there were 11,811 people, 4,145 households, and 3,253 families living in the city. The racial makeup of the city was 90.3% White, 0.8% African American, 1.2% Native American, 1.9% Asian, 0.2% Pacific Islander, 2.4% from other races, and 3.2% from two or more races. Hispanic or Latino of any race were 7.1% of the population.

There were 4,145 households, of which 43.1% had children under the age of 18 living with them, 65.7% were married couples living together, 8.7% had a female householder with no husband present, 4.1% had a male householder with no wife present, and 21.5% were non-families. 17.0% of all households were made up of individuals, and 4.5% had someone living alone who was 65 years of age or older. The average household size was 2.85 and the average family size was 3.22.

The median age in the city was 35.4 years. 29.6% of residents were under the age of 18; 7% were between the ages of 18 and 24; 27.7% were from 25 to 44; 27.5% were from 45 to 64; and 8.3% were 65 years of age or older. The gender makeup of the city was 50.5% male and 49.5% female.

2000 census
As of the 2000 census, there were 8,385 people, 2,937 households, and 2,305 families living in the city. The population density was 386.1 per square mile (149.1/km2). There were 3,092 housing units at an average density of 142.4 per square mile (55.0/km2). The racial makeup of the city was 93.18% White, 0.56% African American, 0.50% Native American, 1.65% Asian, 0.02% Pacific Islander, 1.86% from other races, and 2.23% from two or more races. Hispanic or Latino of any race were 4.83% of the population.

There were 2,937 households, out of which 45.9% had children under the age of 18 living with them, 66.9% were married couples living together, 7.9% had a female householder with no husband present, and 21.5% were non-families. 17.2% of all households were made up of individuals, and 4.0% had someone living alone who was 65 years of age or older. The average household size was 2.85 and the average family size was 3.24.

In the city, the age distribution of the population shows 32.7% under the age of 18, 6.3% from 18 to 24, 33.3% from 25 to 44, 21.7% from 45 to 64, and 6.1% who were 65 years of age or older. The median age was 33 years. For every 100 females, there were 101.5 males. For every 100 females age 18 and over, there were 99.9 males.

The median income for a household in the city was $57,750, and the median income for a family was $61,813. Males had a median income of $50,785 versus $29,595 for females. The per capita income for the city was $22,499. About 3.9% of families and 4.5% of the population were below the poverty line, including 5.5% of those under age 18 and 6.7% of those age 65 or over.

Businesses

 SSC North America, an automobile manufacturer credited with creating the former fastest production car in the world, the SSC Aero.

Notable people
 Ryan Kennelly, world record geared bench-press holder (1075 lbs, 489 kg).
 Rachel Willis-Sørensen, opera singer

Notes

References

External links

 City of West Richland
 West Richland Chamber of Commerce
 Benton Rural Electric Association
 Tri-City Herald newspaper
Tri-City Regional Chamber of Commerce

Cities in Benton County, Washington
Cities in Washington (state)
Tri-Cities, Washington
Populated places established in 1955
1955 establishments in Washington (state)
Populated places on the Yakima River
World War II Heritage Cities